is a professional Japanese baseball pitcher for the Chiba Lotte Marines of Nippon Professional Baseball (NPB). He has previously played in NPB for the Yokohama DeNA BayStars.

Career

Yokohama DeNA BayStars
Kuniyoshi played for the Yokohama DeNA BayStars from 2010 to 2021. In 11 seasons for the BayStars, he pitched to a 21-30 record and 3.87 ERA with 420 strikeouts in 446.0 total innings of work across 238 games.

Chiba Lotte Marines
On June 14, 2021, Kuniyoshi was traded to the Chiba Lotte Marines in exchange for Yuki Ariyoshi.

Kuniyoshi signed with the Canberra Cavalry of the Australian Baseball League for the 2018/19 season.

References

External links

 NPB.com

1991 births
Living people
People from Hirakata
Japanese expatriate baseball players in Australia
Nippon Professional Baseball pitchers
Yokohama BayStars players
Yokohama DeNA BayStars players
Canberra Cavalry players
Baseball people from Osaka Prefecture